Metropolitan Tikhon (secular name Marc Raymond Mollard; born July 15, 1966, in Boston, Massachusetts) is an Eastern Orthodox bishop and the Primate of the Orthodox Church in America, holding the rank of Metropolitan of All America and Canada. Previously, he was the ruling bishop of Philadelphia and Eastern Pennsylvania. He was elected as Metropolitan of the Orthodox Church in America on November 13, 2012 at the 17th All-American Council in Parma, Ohio.

Life
Marc Raymond Mollard was born in Boston, Massachusetts on July 15, 1966, the oldest of three children born to Francois and Elizabeth Mollard. He was reared in the Episcopal Church.

After brief periods living in Connecticut, France, and Missouri, he and his family settled in Reading, Pennsylvania, where he graduated from Wyomissing Area High School in 1984. In 1988 he received a Bachelor of Arts degree in French and Sociology from Franklin & Marshall College, Lancaster, Pennsylvania. After graduation, he moved to Chicago, where he attended services at Ss. Peter and Paul Church (Orthodox Church in America).

In 1989 he was received into the Orthodox Church from the Episcopal Church. In the fall of the same year, he began studies at St. Tikhon's Seminary in South Canaan, Pennsylvania. One year later he entered the monastic community at St. Tikhon's Monastery as a novice.

After receiving his Master of Divinity degree from St. Tikhon's in 1993, Mollard was appointed as an instructor in Old Testament Studies there. He continues to serve as senior lecturer in Old Testament, teaching master's-level courses in the prophets, the Psalms, and wisdom literature. He is also an instructor in the seminary's extension studies program, offering courses in the lives of the Old Testament saints, the liturgical use of the Old Testament, and the Old Testament in patristic literature.

In 1995 Mollard was tonsured to the lesser schema by Archbishop Herman (Swaiko) and given the name Tikhon in honor of St. Tikhon of Moscow. Later that year he was ordained to the Holy Diaconate and Holy Priesthood at St. Tikhon's Monastery. In 1998 he was elevated to the rank of hegumen and in 2000 to the rank of archimandrite.

Archimandrite Tikhon collaborated with Hegumen Alexander (Golitzin) in the publication of The Living Witness of the Holy Mountain, published by St. Tikhon Seminary Press (1996). He illustrated this book about Mount Athos.

In December 2002, Tikhon was appointed by Metropolitan Herman to serve as deputy abbot of St. Tikhon's Monastery.

During the Fall Session of Synod of the OCA on October 20–23, 2003, Archimandrite Tikhon was elected as Bishop of South Canaan and Auxiliary to Metropolitan Herman. Tikhon was consecrated to the episcopacy at the monastery on Saturday, February 14, 2004 by Archbishop Herman, becoming Bishop of South Canaan.

At a special session of the Holy Synod of Bishops of the Orthodox Church in America held on May 27, 2005, Bishop Tikhon of South Canaan was elected as Bishop of Philadelphia and Eastern Pennsylvania. On October 29, 2005, Bishop Tikhon was officially installed as the ruling hierarch of the Diocese of Philadelphia and Eastern Pennsylvania during Divine Liturgy at the Saint Stephen Cathedral.

For a part of 2011 he was temporary administrator of the Diocese of the Midwest.

On May 9, 2012 he was elevated to the rank of archbishop.

On November 13, 2012 Archbishop Tikhon was elected Metropolitan of All America and Canada, of the Orthodox Church in America. He is the second convert to be elected to this office, following his predecessor.

References

External links
 Bishop Tikhon installed as ruling hierarch of the Diocese of Philadelphia and Eastern Pennsylvania - OCA Web site.
 Office of the Rector
 February Date Set for Episcopal Consecration of Bishop-elect Tikhon
 Bishop Tikhon of Philadelphia and Eastern Pennsylvania

1966 births
Living people
Primates of the Orthodox Church in America
Converts to Eastern Orthodoxy from Anglicanism
Franklin & Marshall College alumni
Old Testament scholars
Clergy from Boston
21st-century Eastern Orthodox archbishops
20th-century Eastern Orthodox priests
Archimandrites
20th-century American clergy
21st-century American clergy
Recipients of the Order of Prince Yaroslav the Wise, 1st class